Trinchera Creek is a tributary of the Rio Grande in Costilla County, Colorado in the United States. It flows west from a source in the Sangre de Cristo Mountains to a confluence with the Rio Grande.

It is spanned by the San Luis Southern Railway Trestle, which is listed on the National Register of Historic Places.

Dams
The creek has two dams which create reservoirs that are popular fishing spots. The reservoirs include Mountain Home Reservoir near Fort Garland and Smith Reservoir three miles south of Blanca.

See also
 List of rivers of Colorado

References

Rivers of Colorado
Rivers of Costilla County, Colorado
Tributaries of the Rio Grande